The 2005 UCLA Bruins football team represented the University of California, Los Angeles in the 2005 NCAA Division I-A football season.  They played their home games at the Rose Bowl in Pasadena, California and were coached by Karl Dorrell. It was Dorrell's third season as the UCLA head coach.  The Bruins finished 10–2 overall, and were third in the Pacific-10 Conference with a 6–2 record.  The Bruins were invited to play in the Vitalis Sun Bowl vs. Northwestern on December 30, 2005.  After giving up 22 unanswered points in the first quarter, the Bruins came back to win 50–38.  The team was ranked #16 in the final AP Poll and #13 in the final Coaches Poll.

Pre-season

UCLA was ranked #24 by Lindy's and #19 by Blue Ribbon in the pre-season polls.

Schedule

Game summaries

San Diego State

Rice

Oklahoma

Source: ESPN

Washington

California

Washington State

Oregon State

Stanford

Arizona

Arizona State

USC

On June 10, 2010, the NCAA found that Reggie Bush was ineligible for college athletics during the 2005 season, and USC was forced to vacate all wins from that year.

Sun Bowl

UCLA overcame a 22–0 deficit to Northwestern in the first quarter to win 50–38.

Rankings

References

UCLA
UCLA Bruins football seasons
Sun Bowl champion seasons
UCLA Bruins football